Payaso may refer to:
 Payaso (1952 film), an Argentine film
 Payaso (1986 film), a Philippine comedy drama film
 Payaso, a song from the Latin pop album Recuerdo a Javier Solís

External links